A referendum on creating the post of Chief Councillor was held in Saint Helena on 23 March 2013. The proposal was rejected by 80% of voters, with voter turnout at just 10%.

Background
In January 2013 the Government of Saint Helena published proposals for amendments to the constitution. This included the appointment of a Chief Councillor from the 12-member Legislative Council, who would appoint a further four members of the Executive Council instead of the entire Executive Council being elected by the Legislative Council.

Results

References

2013 referendums
2013 in Saint Helena
Chief Councillor, 2013